The World Rowing Championships is an international rowing regatta organized by FISA (the International Rowing Federation). It is a week-long event held at the end of the northern hemisphere summer and in non-Olympic years is the highlight of the international rowing calendar.

History
The first event was held in Lucerne, Switzerland, in 1962. The event then was held every four years until 1974, when it became an annual competition. Also in 1974, Men's lightweight and Women's open weight events were added to the championships.

Initially, Men's events were 2000 metres long and Women's events 1000 metres. At the 1984 World Championships in Montreal, Canada, Women's lightweight demonstration events were raced over a 2000-metre course for the first time. In 1985, Women's lightweight events were officially added to the schedule and all Men's and Women's events were contested over a 2000-metre course.

Since 1996, during (Summer) Olympic years, the World Rowing Junior Championships are held at the same time.

In 2002 adaptive rowing events were introduced for the following classes of disability: LTA (legs, trunk and arms), TA (trunk, arms), and A (arms-only). In 2009 the A category was replaced by AS (arms and shoulders), and an ID (intellectually disabled) category was added (but then removed after the 2011 Championships).  From 2017 the designations AS, TA, and LTA have been changed to PR1, PR2, and PR3.

Boats
Rowing takes place in 21 different boat classes, apart from during Olympic years when only non-Olympic boat classes race. National teams generally take less interest in the non-Olympic events, as the Olympic events are considered the "premier" events.

The table below shows the boat classes, "O" indicates the boat races at both the Olympics and World Championships. "WC" indicates this is only a World Championship event. After 2007, the coxed fours (4+) no longer runs as a world championship event.  Similarly after 2011 the women's coxless four was no longer included, but it was reintroduced in 2013.  Lightweight men's eight was removed after 2015.

As a result of the IOC's aim for gender parity, it has been agreed that for 2020 onwards the lightweight men's coxless four will be removed from the Olympics and replaced by women's coxless four.

At the 2017 FISA Ordinary Congress there were further revisions, removing M2+ and LM4- from the World Championships, and reinstating LW2-.

Editions
World Rowing Championships have been held since 1962, first every four years and since 1974 annually. Due to the unfolding COVID-19 pandemic, the World Rowing Federation cancelled all international events for 2020 on 9 April 2020, some time after the 2020 Summer Olympics and Summer Paralympics had been postponed by one year. This included the 2020 World Rowing Championships regatta scheduled for Bled in Slovenia. On 11 July 2021, the World Rowing Federation announced that it had accepted the request by the Shanghai Organising Committee to also cancel the October 2021 World Rowing Championships that were to be held in Shanghai, China. On 14 July, after having received feedback from member organisations about the importance of international competitions, the World Rowing Federation confirmed that the cancellation of the 2021 championships is unavoidable.

 2020 in Bled,  was cancelled.
 2021 in Shanghai,  was cancelled.
 R = Rowing / PR = Para Rowing

Hosts (1962–2022)

Medals
Source:

Rowing (1962–2022)

Para Rowing (2002–2022)

Multiple medallists

Scull and sweep medalists
incomplete list

Martin and Valent Sinković are the first crew in rowing history that in the same composition won gold medals at World Championship in sweep and scull rowing.

References

External links
 of the World Rowing

 
Rowing
Recurring sporting events established in 1962
Rowing competitions